Josef also Joseph Otto Entres (13 March 1804 – 14 May 1870) was a German sculptor and painter.

Entres was born in Fürth, and studied sculpture in Munich after July 1822, where he was a student of Konrad Eberhard. He died in Munich, where he lived at Herbststraße and at Salzstraße around 1850.

See also
 List of German painters

References 

1804 births
1870 deaths
19th-century German painters
19th-century German male artists
German male painters
German sculptors
German male sculptors
People from Fürth
19th-century sculptors